Shivar Springs Bottling Company Cisterns is a set of six historic cisterns located near Winnsboro, Fairfield County, South Carolina. They were built about 1900, and are a group of six cylindrical, stuccoed stone cisterns with concrete domes. The Shivar Springs Bottling Company was in operation from about 1900 to about 1950. At first the company produced only mineral water which was sold for medicinal purposes. Later both mineral water and soft drinks were produced from the spring water and shipped throughout the state.

It was added to the National Register of Historic Places in 1984.

References

Industrial buildings and structures on the National Register of Historic Places in South Carolina
Industrial buildings completed in 1900
Buildings and structures in Fairfield County, South Carolina
National Register of Historic Places in Fairfield County, South Carolina
Reservoirs in South Carolina
Bottled water brands
Mineral water